"Danny Deever" is an 1890 poem by Rudyard Kipling, one of the first of the Barrack-Room Ballads. It received wide critical and popular acclaim, and is often regarded as one of the most significant pieces of Kipling's early verse. The poem, a ballad, describes the execution of a British soldier in India for murder. His execution is viewed by his regiment, paraded to watch it, and the poem is composed of the comments they exchange as they see him hanged.

Context
The poem was first published on 22 February 1890 in the Scots Observer, in America later in the year, and printed as part of the Barrack-Room Ballads shortly thereafter.

It is generally read as being set in India, though it gives no details of the actual situation. Some research has suggested that the poem was written with a specific incident in mind, the execution of one Private Flaxman of The Leicestershire Regiment, at Lucknow in 1887. A number of details of this execution correspond to the occasion described by Kipling in the poem, and he later used a story similar to that of Flaxman's as a basis for the story Black Jack.

Kipling apparently wrote the various Barrack-Room Ballads in early 1890, about a year since he had last been in India, and three years since Flaxman's execution. Though he wrote large amounts of occasional verse, he usually added a note beneath the title giving the context of the poem. Danny Deever does not have any such notes, but "Cleared" (a topical poem on the Parnell Commission), written in the same month as Danny Deever, does. This suggests that it was not thought by Kipling to be inspired by a specific incident, though it is quite possible that he remembered the Flaxman case.

Summary
The form is a dialogue, between a young and inexperienced soldier (or soldiers; he is given as "Files-on-Parade", suggesting a group) and a more experienced and older NCO ("the Colour-Sergeant"). The setting is an execution, generally presumed to be somewhere in India; a soldier, one Danny Deever, has been tried and sentenced to death for murdering a fellow soldier in his sleep, and his battalion is paraded to see the hanging. This procedure strengthened discipline in the unit, by a process of deterrence, and helped inure inexperienced soldiers to the sight of death.

The young soldier is unaware of what is happening, at first – he asks why the bugles are blowing, and why the Sergeant looks so pale, but is told that Deever is being hanged, and that the regiment is drawn up in "[h]ollow square" to see it. He presses the Sergeant further, in the second verse – why are people breathing so hard? why does a man in the front-rank collapse? These signs of the effect that watching the hanging has upon the men of the regiment are explained away by the Sergeant as being due to the cold weather or the bright sun. The voice is reassuring, keeping the young soldier calm in the sight of death, just as the Sergeant will calm him with his voice in combat. In the third verse, Files thinks of Deever, saying that he slept alongside him, and drank with him, but the Sergeant reminds him that Deever is now alone, that he sleeps "out an' far to-night", and reminds the soldier of the magnitude of Deever's crime –

(Nine hundred was roughly the number of men in a single infantry battalion, and as regiments were formed on local lines, most would have been from the same county; it is thus emphasised that his crime is a black mark against both the regiment, as a whole, and against his comrades). The fourth verse comes to the hanging; Files sees the body against the sun, and then feels his soul as it "whimpers" overhead; the term reflects a shudder in the ranks as they watch Deever die. Finally, the Sergeant moves the men away; though it is not directly mentioned in the poem, they would be marched past the corpse on the gallows – reflecting that the recruits are shaking after their ordeal, and that "they'll want their beer to-day".

Structure
The poem is composed of four eight-line verses, containing a dialogue between two (or three) voices: 

It is immediately noticeable that the poem is written in a vernacular English. Though the Barrack-Room Ballads have made this appear a common feature of Kipling's work, at the time it was quite unusual; this was the first of his published works to be written in the voice of the common soldier. The speech is not a direct representation of any single dialect, but it serves to give a very clear effect of a working class English voice of the period. Note the "taken of his buttons off", a deliberate error, to add to the stylised speech; it refers to the ceremony of military degradation, where the man to be executed is formally stripped of any marks of rank, such as his stripes, or of significant parts of his uniform – the buttons bore the regimental crest.

The four verses each consist of two questions asked by "Files" and answered by the Sergeant- a call-and-response form – and then another four lines of the Sergeant explaining, as above. In some interpretations, the second four lines are taken to be spoken by a third voice, another "file-on-parade". Both the poem's rhythm and its rhyme scheme reinforce the idea of drilling infantry by giving the effect of feet marching generally but not perfectly in unison:  Although the poem's overall meter is iambic, each line in the verses and, to the slightly lesser extent, the chorus features syllables with additional grammatical and phonetic emphasis that fit the rhythm of the "left, left, left right left" marching cadence.  The first four lines always end with the same word, and the last four feature an aaab rhyme scheme with slightly lighter syllables that force the pace into a brisk march despite its somber mood (cf. the text of the poem's final chorus). T. S. Eliot noted the imperfect rhyme scheme – parade and said do not quite rhyme – as strongly contributing to this effect, with the slight interruption supporting the feel of a large number of men marching together, not quite in harmony.

Critical reaction
Danny Deever is often seen as one of Kipling's most powerful early works, and was greeted with acclaim when first published. David Masson, a professor of literature at the University of Edinburgh, is often reported (perhaps apocryphally) to have waved the magazine in which it appeared at his students, crying "Here's literature! Here's literature at last!". W. E. Henley, the editor of the Scots Observer, is even said to have danced on his wooden leg when he first received the text.

It was later commented on by William Butler Yeats, who noted that "[Kipling] interests a critical audience today by the grotesque tragedy of Danny Deever". T. S. Eliot called the poem "technically (as well as in content) remarkable", holding it up as one of the best of Kipling's ballads. Both Yeats and Eliot were writing shortly after Kipling's death, in 1936 and 1941, when critical opinion of his poetry was at a low point; both, nonetheless, drew out Danny Deever for attention as a significant work.

T. S. Eliot included the poem in his 1941 collection A Choice of Kipling's Verse.

Discussing that low critical opinion in a 1942 essay, George Orwell considered Danny Deever as an example of Kipling "at his worst, and also his most vital ... almost a shameful pleasure, like the taste for cheap sweets that some people secretly carry into middle life". He felt the work was an example of what he described as "good bad poetry"; verse which is essentially vulgar, yet undeniably seductive and "a sign of the emotional overlap between the intellectual and the ordinary
man."

Music
The Barrack-Room Ballads, as the name suggests, are songs of soldiers. Written by Kipling, they share a form and a style with traditional Army songs. Kipling was one of the first to pay attention to these works; Charles Carrington noted that in contrast to the songs of sailors, "no-one had thought of collecting genuine soldiers' songs, and when Kipling wrote in this traditional style it was not recognised as traditional". Kipling himself was fond of singing his poetry, of writing it to fit the rhythm of a particular tune. In this specific case, the musical source has been suggested as the Army's "grotesque bawdy song" Barnacle Bill the Sailor, but it is possible that some other popular tune of the period was used.

However, the ballads were not published with any music, and though they were quickly adapted to be sung, new musical settings were written; a musical setting by Walter Damrosch was described as "Teddy Roosevelt's favourite song", and is sometimes encountered on its own as a tune entitled They're Hanging Danny Deever in the Morning. To date, at least a dozen published recordings are known, made from 1893 to 1985.

The tune "They're Hanging Danny Deever in the Morning" (Walter Damrosch) was played from the Campanile at UC Berkeley at the end of the last day of classes for the Spring Semester of 1930, and has been repeated every year since, with a certain ironic humour, at the beginning of final exams week, making it one of the oldest campus traditions.

Percy Grainger composed a setting of Danny Deever for male chorus and orchestra.

Danny Deever was also set to music and performed by Leslie Fish (using the Walter Damrosch melody) on an album of Kipling settings.

Peter Bellamy recorded Danny Deever and a number of the other Barrack-Room Ballads in 1975.

Robert Heinlein in Starship Troopers references the ballad twice: once when the Mobile Infantry court-martialled Theodor C. Hendrick for assaulting a superior officer during basic training while in a state of emergency, and the second time when the regimental band played the ballad prior to the execution of a deserter, Dillinger, who, like Danny Deever, had committed murder.

See also
 1892 in poetry
 1892 in literature

Notes

References
A Choice of Kipling's Verse, T.S. Eliot, Faber and Faber, 1963. 
Rudyard Kipling: his life and work, Charles Carrington. Pelican, 1970.  (original edition 1955)

External links

Text of Danny Deever at the Online Literature Network
Spoken version of Danny Deever, by Jane Aker, as an mp3 file
Two recordings of the Walter Damrosch setting of Danny Deever at the Library of Congress

Poetry by Rudyard Kipling
1890 poems
Works originally published in British newspapers
Rudyard Kipling poems about India
Hanging in fiction